Kim Ju-hwan (born 17 February 2001) is a South Korean footballer currently playing as a right back for Pohang Steelers.

Career statistics

Club

References

2001 births
Living people
South Korean footballers
South Korea youth international footballers
Association football defenders
K League 1 players
Pohang Steelers players